The Wile Carding Mill is a defunct but still operational carding mill, in Bridgewater, Nova Scotia, Canada. The mill is now owned by the Province of Nova Scotia and operated as a museum by the DesBrisay Museum.

This water-powered mill was owned and operated by the Wile family from 1860 to 1968. The Wiles ran the mill but employed a number of workers, usually unmarried women, to operate the machinery. The mill was powered by a 7-horsepower (5 kW) overshot waterwheel using the water of Shady Brook, a tributary of the Lahave River.

It became a Registered Heritage Property in Bridgewater in 2013.

See also
Bridgewater, Nova Scotia
Nova Scotia Museum

References

Textile mills
Defunct textile companies of Canada
Museums in Lunenburg County, Nova Scotia
Watermills in Canada
Textile museums
Technology museums
History museums in Nova Scotia
Bridgewater, Nova Scotia
Nova Scotia Museum